Tomi Karhunen (born 29 October 1989) is a Finnish professional ice hockey goaltender. He is currently playing with SC Bern of the National League (NL).

Playing career 
Karhunen made his SM-liiga debut playing with Oulun Kärpät during the 2010–11 SM-liiga season. At the end of the 2011–12 campaign, he joined HC Slovan Bratislava on loan, helping the team capture the Slovak championship. He won the Finnish SM-liiga title with Kärpät in 2014 and 2015.

In summer 2015, he was transferred to fellow SM-liiga team Tappara and won his third straight championship during the 2015-16 season.

He signed with newly founded KHL side Kunlun Red Star from China in July 2016. Seeing limited ice time due competition with Swedish national team goalie Magnus Hellberg, he signed with HC Vityaz Podolsk for the remaining of the 2017–18 season.

Karhunen made 12 appearances with Brynäs IF in the Swedish Hockey League to start the 2018–19 season, posting an impressive 2.27 goals against average before opting to return for a second stint with Kunlun Red Star of the KHL on 4 December 2018.

References

External links
 

1989 births
Living people
HC Ambrì-Piotta players
SC Bern players
Brynäs IF players
Finnish ice hockey goaltenders
HIFK (ice hockey) players
HC Kunlun Red Star players
Lahti Pelicans players
Oulun Kärpät players
Sarnia Sting players
Sportspeople from Oulu
HC Slovan Bratislava players
Straubing Tigers players
Tappara players
HC Vityaz players
EC VSV players
Finnish expatriate ice hockey players in China
Finnish expatriate ice hockey players in Slovakia
Finnish expatriate ice hockey players in Sweden
Finnish expatriate ice hockey players in Switzerland
Finnish expatriate ice hockey players in Russia
Finnish expatriate ice hockey players in Germany
Finnish expatriate ice hockey players in Austria